"Mirror" is a song recorded by English singer-songwriter duo Ider for their debut studio album Emotional Education. It was released on 18 October 2018 as the third single from the album.

Background and composition
"Mirror" was a combination of drafted compositions by both Markwick and Somerville, respectively, and they later collated these into the one song. Lyrically, the song deals with self-worth, depression, anxiety and identity. The middle eight is a rap.

Music video
The music video for "Mirror" was released on 5 November 2018. The video features Markwick and Somerville looking at themselves in the mirror, alongside choreographed dance routine. The video was directed by Lily Rose Thomas and choreographed by Anna Engström.

Track listing
Digital download
 "Mirror" – 3:38

Honors Remix
 "Mirror (Honors Remix)" – 4:25

12welve Remix
 "Mirror (12welve Remix)" – 3:24

Credits and personnel
 Lily Somerville – vocals, keyboard
 Megan Markwick – vocals, synth
 Ben Scott – drums
 MyRiot – production

References

2018 singles
2018 songs
Ider (band) songs